The Archdiocese of Cagliari is a Roman Catholic archdiocese centred on the city of Cagliari. It holds the Primacy of Sardinia.

History

Legend relates how a disciple of Jesus Christ, one Bonifatius, preached the Gospel in Cagliari in the 1st century. There were probably bishops at Cagliari from an early date, however, as Athanasius of Alexandria speaks of previous episcopal martyrs (during the Diocletian persecution most likely) in a letter to his contemporary, the first well-known bishop of Cagliari, Lucifer. Cagliari remained Roman Catholic despite the Arianism prevalent at the time and many African bishops fled the Arian Vandals to come to Cagliari. At the time of the Second Council of Constantinople (681), Cagliari was already a metropolitan see. It has been suggested that in the 10th and 11th century as the giudicati of Sardinia became independent, the archbishop of Cagliari became the de facto theocratic ruler of the island through the Corona de Logu.

In 1075, Pope Gregory VII reproached the Archbishop James for wearing a beard, a fashion which had been introduced into Sardinia at an earlier date; the pope asked the Judge Torchitorio I to oblige the clergy to abandon this custom. The same bishop and his colleagues were blamed by Pope Victor III (1087) for neglect of their churches. Under this pope, the Archbishop of Cagliari became known as the Primate of Sardinia. In the 12th century, however, the prominence of Cagliari was reduced vis-à-vis the Archdiocese of Torres in the north of the island. In 1158, the title of Primate of Sardinia and Corsica was given to the Archbishop of Pisa, but in 1409 it was reassumed by the Archbishop of Cagliari, whence arose a controversy between those sees, which dragged on into the 20th century.

Pope Paul VI became the first Pope to visit Sardinia in 1,650 years when he made his visit to Cagliari Cathedral, which is a minor basilica. Pope John Paul II paid a visit later. Pope Benedict XVI visited in September 2008 while Pope Francis visited in 2013.

Bishops

Diocese of Cagliari
Latin Name: Calaritana
Erected: 4th Century

Archdiocese of Cagliari
Elevated: 11th Century

Giacomo de Abbate (1295–1299 Died)
Ranucio, O.F.M. Conv. (1299– )
...
Gundisalvus Bonihominis (1331–1341 Died)
...
Juan de Aragón, O.F.M. (1354–1369 Died)
...

1420	Territory Added	from the suppressed Diocese of Suelli	

Francesco Ferrer (1460–1467 Appointed Archbishop (Personal Title) of Mallorca)
...
Pietro Pilares, O.P. (1484–1514 Resigned)

1503	Territory Added	from the suppressed Diocese of Dolia

Juan Pilars (1514–1521 Died)
Jerónimo Vilanova (1521–1534 Died)
Domenico Pastorello, O.F.M. Conv. (1534–1547 Died)
Baltasar de Heredia, O.P. (1548–1558 Resigned)
Antonio Paragües Castillejo, O.S.B. (1558–1572 Died)
Francisco Pérez (archbishop) (1574–1577 Died)
Gaspar Vicente Novella (1578–1586 Died)
Francisco de Val (1587–1595 Died)
Alfonso Laso Sedeño (1596–1604 Appointed Archbishop (Personal Title) of Mallorca)
Francisco Esquivel (1605–1624 Died)
Lorenzo Nieto y Corrales Montero Nieto, O.S.B. (1625–1626 Died)
Ambrogio Machin, O. de M. (1627–1640 Died)
Bernardo Lacabra (1643–1655 Died)
Pietro de Vico (archbishop) (1657–1676 Died)
Diego Ventura Fernández de Angulo, O.F.M. (1676–1683 Confirmed Archbishop (Personal Title) of Ávila)
Antonio de Vergara, O.P. (1683–1685 Confirmed Archbishop (Personal Title) of Zamora)
Luis Díaz Aux de Armendáriz, O. de M. (1686–1689 Died)
Francesco di Sobre Casas, O.P. (1689–1698 Died)
Bernardo di Cariñena Ipenza y Saulini, O. de M. (1699–1722 Died)
Giovanni Giuseppe Falletti (1726–1748 Died)
Giulio Cesare Gandolfi (1748–1758 Died)
Tommaso Ignazio Marie Natta, O.P. (1759–1763 Resigned)
Giuseppe Agostino Delbecchi, Sch. P. (1763–1777 Died)
Vittorio Filippo Melano di Portula, O.P. (1778–1797 Confirmed Archbishop (Personal Title) of Novara)
Diego Gregorio Cadello (1798–1807 Died)
Nicolo Navoni (1819–1836 Died)

8 November 1824: Territory Lost to form the Diocese of Ogliastra

Antonio Raimondo Tore (1837–1840 Died)
Giovanni Emanuele Marongiu Nurra (1842–1866 Died)
Giovanni Antonio Balma, O.M.V. (1871–1881 Died)
Vincenzo Gregorio Berchialla, O.M.V. (1881–1892 Died)
Paolo Giuseppe Maria Serci Serra (1893–1900 Died)
Pietro Balestra, O.F.M. Conv. (1900–1912 Died)
Francesco Rossi (1913–1919 Appointed Archbishop of Ferrara)
Ernesto Maria Piovella, Obl. Rho (1920–1949 Died)
Paolo Botto (1949–1969 Resigned)
Sebastiano Baggio (1969–1973 Appointed Prefect of the Congregation for Bishops); was already Cardinal
Giuseppe Bonfigioli (1973–1984 Resigned)
Giovanni Canestri (1984–1987 Appointed Archbishop of Genoa and Bobbio (Cardinal in 1988))
Ottorino Pietro Alberti (1987–2003 Retired)
Giuseppe Mani (2003–2012 Retired)
Arrigo Miglio (2012–2019 Retired)
Giuseppe Baturi (2019-)

Episcopal sees
Iglesias
Lanusei
Nuoro

See also
 History of Cagliari
 Timeline of Cagliari

Notes

External links

Cagliari
Cagliari
Cagliari